Himantariidae is a monophyletic family of centipedes in the order Geophilomorpha and superfamily Himantarioidea, found almost exclusively in the Northern Hemisphere. The number of leg-bearing segments in this family ranges from 47 to 181. These centipedes are very elongated with a high mean number of trunk segments (often greater than 100) and great variability in this number within species. This family contains these genera:

Acrophilus
Bothriogaster
Californiphilus
Causerium
Chomatobius
Diadenoschisma
Geoballus
Gosiphilus
Gosothrix
Haplophilus
Himantariella
Himantarium
Meinertophilus
Mesocanthus
Nesoporogaster
Nothobius
Notiphilus
Notobius
Polyporogaster
Pseudohimantarium
Stigmatogaster
Straberax
Thracophilus

References

Centipede families
Geophilomorpha